This is a list of Number 1 hit singles in 1964 in New Zealand from the Lever Hit Parade.

Chart

References

 Number One Singles Of 1964

1964 in New Zealand
1964 record charts
1964
1960s in New Zealand music